Carlos Barreto (July 25, 1976 – October 12, 1999) was a bantamweight boxer from Venezuela, who represented his native country at the 1996 Summer Olympics in Atlanta, Georgia.

Olympic results
Defeated Aleksandar Hristov (Bulgaria) 9-3
Lost to Vichairachanon Khadpo (Thailand) 6-14

Pro career
He made his professional debut on September 21, 1996. He died on October 12, 1999, three days after a bout against José Luis Valbuena in Caracas, where he collapsed after the fight and was removed on a stretcher. He died due to brain injuries sustained in the match.

References
 
 

   

1976 births
1999 deaths
Sportspeople from Caracas
Bantamweight boxers
Boxers at the 1996 Summer Olympics
Olympic boxers of Venezuela
Deaths due to injuries sustained in boxing
Sport deaths in Venezuela
Venezuelan male boxers
20th-century Venezuelan people